The Ven. Frank McGowan, MBE, MA was an Anglican priest: the Archdeacon of Sarum from 1951 until his death on 21 February 1968.
Born on 7 October 1895, he was educated at St Edmund Hall, Oxford. After World War I service with the Duke of Wellington's Regiment and later the Machine Gun Corps wounded in action he was discharged and awarded a British War Medal, Allied Victory Medal and Discharge badge No 366001. He was ordained in 1923. He was a curate at St Michael and All Angels, Bournemouth before serving incumbencies at St Mark's, Birmingham and then St Nicholas, Cholderton until his archdeacon's appointment.

References

1895 births
Alumni of St Edmund Hall, Oxford
Duke of Wellington's Regiment officers
Members of the Order of the British Empire
Archdeacons of Sarum
1968 deaths
Machine Gun Corps officers